The succession tracts of the Elizabethan period, continuing into the reign of James I of England, debated the legal status, and other attributes, of candidates to succeed Elizabeth I of England.

Early tracts

Later tracts
A statute of 1581 forbade in terms publication on, and other discussion of, the succession.

See also
List of Jacobean union tracts

References

Notes

Elizabeth I
Elizabethan